Duan is an East Asian surname of Chinese origin that can be found in China, Vietnam and Korea.

Notable people

Mainland China 
 Duan Sui (died 386), a ruler of the Xianbei state Western Yan
 Duan Ye (died 401), the first king of the Northern Liang of the Sixteen Kingdoms period
 Duan Siping (893-944), founder of the Kingdom of Dali
 Duan Yucai (1735–1815), philologist
 Duan Qirui (1865–1936), warlord and politician, President of the Republic of China
 Duan Qingbo (1964–2019), archaeologist
 Duan Yixuan, singer, actress, and member of the Chinese idol group SNH48
 Duan Aojuan, singer, former member of Rocket Girls 101

Vietnam 
 Đoàn Thượng (1181–1228), general of the Lý dynasty of King Lý Cao Tông and Lý Huệ Tông.
 Đoàn Thị Điểm (1705–1748), female poet

Other 
 Tuan Yi-kang, Taiwanese politician
 Mark Tuan, singer and member of South Korean boy group GOT7

See also 
 Doãn

Chinese-language surnames
Korean-language surnames
Individual Chinese surnames